Fort Dobbs was an 18th-century fort in the Yadkin–Pee Dee River Basin region of the Province of North Carolina, near what is now Statesville in Iredell County. Used for frontier defense during and after the French and Indian War, the fort was built to protect the American settlers of the western portion of what was then Rowan County, and served as a vital outpost for soldiers, traders, and colonial officials. Fort Dobbs' primary structure was a blockhouse with log walls, surrounded by a shallow ditch, and by 1761, a palisade.  It was intended to provide protection from French-allied Native Americans such as the Shawnee and Delaware, and French raids into North Carolina.

The fort's name honored Arthur Dobbs, the Royal Governor of North Carolina from 1755 to 1765, who played a role in designing the fort and authorized its construction. Between 1756 and 1761, the fort was garrisoned by a variable number of soldiers, many of whom were sent to fight in Pennsylvania and the Ohio River Valley during the French and Indian War. On February 27, 1760, the fort was the site of an engagement between Cherokee warriors and Provincial soldiers that ended in a victory for the Provincials.  After this battle and other attacks by Cherokee warriors on North Carolinan settlements, several successful counter-attacks were inflicted by the Provincials against the Cherokee, largely quelling their incursions.

Fort Dobbs was abandoned after 1761, and disappeared from the landscape.  Archaeology and historical research led to the discovery of the fort's exact location and probable appearance.  The site on which the fort sat is now operated by North Carolina's Division of State Historic Sites and Properties as Fort Dobbs State Historic Site.   The reconstruction of the fort was completed on September 21, 2019.

Background

Settlement of the Carolina back-country
In 1747, approximately 100 men of suitable age to serve in the colonial militia lived in North Carolina west of present-day Hillsborough.  Within three years, most of North Carolina's population increase, driven mainly by the immigration of Scots-Irish and German settlers traveling from Pennsylvania on the Great Wagon Road, was occurring in seven western counties created after 1740. By 1754, six western counties—Orange, Granville, Johnston, Cumberland, Anson, and Rowan—held around 22,000 residents out of the colony's total population of 65,000.

Construction

In 1756, Governor Arthur Dobbs ordered the construction of a fortified log structure for the protection of settlers in Rowan County from French and French-allied Native American attacks. Dobbs stated in a letter on August 24, 1755, to the Board of Trade that the fort was needed "to assist the back settlers and be a retreat to them as it was beyond the well settled Country, only straggling settlements behind them, and if I had placed [Waddell's garrison] beyond the Settlements without a fortification they might be exposed, and be no retreat for the Settlers, and the Indians might pass them and murder the Inhabitants, and retire before they durst go to give them notice". The new frontier settlements required regular protection.

The North Carolina Legislature set aside a sum of £1000 for the construction of the fort in October 1755.  Provincial soldiers, known by the shortened name "Provincials", were soldiers raised, clothed, and paid by the individual thirteen colonies, although they were at various times armed and supplied by the Crown.  The total cost of the fort was only £1,000.  By comparison, Fort Stanwix in New York, begun in 1758 in a then-modern star fort style, cost £60,000 to erect, while the construction of Fort Prince George in South Carolina cost that province's House of Commons £3,000.

Dobbs likely had a role in designing the fort, as he had designed at least one other fort in North Carolina, as well as a number of structures in Ireland.  Hugh Waddell, an Irish soldier who had close ties to Governor Dobbs and who was the commander of "Frontier Company" of Provincial soldiers in 1755, oversaw construction of the fort, and named it after the governor. The land on which the fort was located was a part of a  tract owned first by one James Oliphant, then by a Fergus Sloan. Part of the same tract was used for the Fourth Creek Congregation Meeting House (so named because the settlement was on the fourth creek one would pass traveling west on the South Yadkin River from Salisbury) in 1755, which was the principal structure around which the modern city of Statesville was founded.  After construction was completed, it was the only military installation on the colonial frontier between Virginia and South Carolina.

Description and effectiveness
By July 1756, Waddell had substantially completed construction on the fort.  Francis Brown and future governor Richard Caswell, commissioners appointed by Dobbs to inspect frontier defenses, wrote the following report to the North Carolina General Assembly on December 21, 1756:

The commissioners generally found the defenses of the rest of the North Carolina frontier to be inadequate.  In 1756, the North Carolina General Assembly petitioned King George II for assistance, stating that the frontier remained in a relatively defenseless state.  The address to the king further noted that after the fall of Fort Oswego to the French and their native allies in that year, the legislators did not believe that Fort Dobbs would provide a substantial defensive advantage.  Settlers west of the Yadkin River were subjected to regular attacks so that between 1756 and 1759, even after the construction of Fort Dobbs, the population of settlers in the area declined from approximately 1,500 to 800.

In 1759, Waddell ordered six swivel guns for use Of Fort Dobbs.  Oral tradition in Iredell County holds that two such swivel guns were mounted at Fort Dobbs, but evidence of the exact quantity present at the fort has not been conclusively established.

Use and conflict

Early uses
Between 1756 and 1760, Fort Dobbs was used as a base of operations for Waddell's company of provincials.  Dobbs also employed Waddell and the fort to conduct diplomacy with the province's native neighbors.  The governor gave specific instructions on July 18, 1756, in a letter sent from New Bern to Waddell, who had just finished supervising the construction of the fort, and two other men, stating:

In addition to warning nearby natives against attacking settlers in the Carolinas, Dobbs also charged Waddell with attempting to keep peace with the Catawba.  In one instance, Dobbs instructed Waddell to turn over a settler who had killed a Catawba hunter in order to placate the hunter's tribesmen, in the event assurances that the settler would be brought to justice under the province's laws did not persuade the Catawba to remain friendly with North Carolina.

In 1756, Dobbs also approved the construction of another fort, this time in lands claimed by the Catawba, as well as both Carolinas, near modern-day Fort Mill, South Carolina.  Workmen under Waddell's command began construction in 1756, but in 1757, Catawba leaders, influenced by South Carolina Governor William Lyttelton, informed North Carolina's government that they no longer wished for this second fort to be built, and construction of the second fort was permanently halted.

At the commencement of the French and Indian War, settlers in the nearby Fourth Creek Congregation settlement sought protection by remaining in close proximity to the fort.   The fort's garrison fluctuated yearly. Initially, a 50-man company manned the fort. With construction of the Catawba fort halted In mid-1757, Bailey's 50-man company was added to the garrison. 1758 saw all of North Carolina's troops sent to Pennsylvania to participate in the Forbes Campaign. The fort was garrisoned by two 30-man companies at the outbreak of the Anglo-Cherokee War in 1759. By the time of the February, 1760 attack on the fort, only one 30-man company was serving at Fort Dobbs.

In Waddell's absence, the fort was under the command of Captain Andrew Bailey.

Decline and fall of Anglo-Cherokee relations

During the Anglo-Cherokee War, which occurred during the later years of the French and Indian War, the fort served as the base for a company of North Carolina provincials tasked with repelling Cherokee raids in the western portion of the province when hostilities broke out between the tribe and North Carolinan settlers in 1758.  The Anglo-Cherokee War began in 1758 after the capture of Fort Duquesne by the British and their native allies, including the Cherokee.  After that fort was taken, the focus of combat in the French and Indian War moved northward, further away from the Cherokee homelands, and a number of Cherokee warriors felt that their contributions to the war effort were unappreciated.  Several colonies, including Virginia and South Carolina, promised the Cherokee that they would build forts near their lands to protect them from hostile attack in exchange for warriors that had been supplied for the war effort.  In Virginia's case, such promises were never fulfilled, and in South Carolina, the promised military presence eventually caused more concern in the Cherokee leadership than it alleviated.  Long-term trends in American settlement, which encroached past the border between the Cherokee and South Carolina that had been set by treaty at Long Cane Creek (west of modern-day Greenwood, South Carolina), elevated Cherokee concern that vital hunting grounds would be permanently lost.

Several pro-French and pro-Creek leaders among the Cherokee pushed for violent actions against American settlers, despite the opposition of severalCherokee leaders.  Eventually tensions between the Cherokee and the American colonists reached a head when Cherokee warriors were attacked by settlers in Virginia, including an unknown number who were ambushed by frontier militia groups who alleged that the Cherokee had slaughtered cattle and stolen horses that belonged to Virginian settlers. The Virginians attempted to sell the massacred Cherokee warriors' scalps to the government of Virginia as the scalps of Shawnee warriors (for which the Virginian Assembly had set a bounty), an act that infuriated the Cherokee. After this and similar occurrences, younger, pro-French leaders among the Cherokee instigated attacks against settlers throughout the frontier.  The colonial military of the South Carolina, which considered the Cherokee towns to be within its sphere of influence, responded by assaulting Cherokees, taking more scalps from the Cherokee and selling them to various colonial legislatures, and the colonial government refused to engage in negotiations with even the most sympathetic Cherokee leaders.

War comes to Fourth Creek
Throughout 1759 and 1760, small Cherokee bands attacked homesteads and communities on the frontier, oftentimes scalping from the settlers they killed. In raids on April 25 and 26, 1759, several parties of Cherokee led by Moytoy of Citico struck at settlements on the Yadkin and Catawba Rivers against the wishes of Cherokee leaders such as Attakullakulla, killing around 19 men, women and children, and taking more than 10 scalps from those killed, including eight scalps from settlers living on Fourth Creek. This violence damaged peace talks between Attakullakulla and South Carolina governor William Lyttelton, who considered the territory west of the Yadkin River in North Carolina to be within South Carolina's sphere of influence. The violence committed by the Cherokee against American settlers continued, which in turn caused the colonial authorities to seek better relations with the Creek and Catawba nations.  The Catawba, who were allied to the provinces of North and South Carolina, were only able to provide minimal assistance to the settlers in the defense of their frontiers, as that tribe's settlements had been decimated by smallpox in 1759 and early 1760.  During this period of violence, members of Daniel Boone's family, who had settled in the area, took refuge in the fort, although Boone himself went to Culpeper County, Virginia with his wife and children. Several scholars have speculated that Boone himself served under Waddell as a member of the frontier provincial company.

All remaining goodwill was lost between Lyttelton's government in Charleston, the North Carolinan government, and the pro-peace Cherokee when Lyttelton ordered the detention of several peace delegations led by headmen Oconostota, Tistoe, and "Round O", despite having previously guaranteed them safe passage.  Lyttelton had the delegations put under armed guard, and secured them at Fort Prince George.  A peace arrangement was agreed upon in December, 1759, although the Cherokee agreed under duress, and the pro-war faction of the Cherokee did not obey its terms.  Several of the signatories for the Cherokee intended to disavow their promises as soon as they were able, in order to seek retribution for the capture of their peace delegations.

Full-blown war broke out across the Carolina frontier by January, 1760.  Between January and February, 1760, more than 77 settlers on the Carolina frontier were killed by Cherokee war parties, and the settlement boundaries of North Carolina had been effectively pushed back by more than 100 miles.  Many of the Cherokee captives held at Fort Prince George were massacred in mid-February, 1760 after an attempt was made to rescue them, in which Ensign Richard Coytmore, the commanding officer of that fort who was much maligned by the Cherokee, was killed.  Lyttelton, who was soon appointed Governor of Jamaica, requested assistance from Dobbs, but North Carolina's militia could not be convinced to serve outside of its home province due to long-standing custom.

Battle
Waddell and his provincials returned to Fort Dobbs after the fall of Fort Duquesne.  The fort's sole engagement occurred when a band of Cherokee warriors attacked on the night of February 27, 1760. During that battle, approximately 10 to 13 warriors died, and one or two provincial soldiers were wounded, while one young boy was killed.  Future American Revolutionary War officer and North Carolina politician Griffith Rutherford, at the time a Captain, may have fought as during the battle under Waddell's command. The Cherokee made off with several horses belonging to Waddell's company, but were ultimately repulsed. Waddell described the action in an official report to the Governor on February 29, 1760:

At around the same time as this attack occurred, Cherokee war parties attacked Fort Loudoun, Fort Prince George, and Ninety-Six, South Carolina.  After this wave, Cherokee war parties continued to threaten Bethabara in the Wachovia Tract, Salisbury, and other settlements in the Yadkin, Catawba, and Broad river basins. The engagement at Fort Dobbs and settlements in the North Carolina Piedmont led the government of North Carolina to join South Carolina and Virginia in their campaign against the Cherokee in their own settlements in North and South Carolina, known as the "Middle" and "Lower Towns".  Initially, though, Governor Dobbs notified Governor Lyttelton of South Carolina that the North Carolina militia would be unable to assist because it could not be compelled to leave the province. The following year, in 1761, various delays hampered the movement of North Carolina troops. In the meantime, approximately 15 Cherokee towns of between 350 and 600 inhabitants were destroyed. The campaign against the Cherokees displaced approximately 5,000 tribe members, and permanently pushed that tribe's zone of control west, across the Appalachian Mountains.

Post-war history
At the conclusion of the French and Indian War in the Treaty of Paris, and after hostilities between the provincials and Cherokee ended with the rolling back of Cherokee boundaries in western North Carolina, the fort quickly became obsolete. On March 7, 1764, the North Carolina General Assembly's Committee on Public Claims recommended to Governor Dobbs that stores and supplies be removed from the fort to spare the government further expense in upkeep.  By 1766, the fort was formally abandoned.

Site preservation and archaeology

Archaeological exploration of the site first occurred in 1847, when a group of local residents attempted to locate a rumored original cannon on the site.  Evidence of this dig was discovered in the 21st century in a later archaeological study.  In 1909, local residents established the Fort Dobbs Chapter of the Daughters of the American Revolution.  That same year, the owners of the parcel of land on which the Fort Dobbs site was located donated  containing the fort's remains to the Fort Dobbs Chapter.  By 1910, the Chapter erected a stone marker at the site, and in 1915, it purchased the 10 acres of land surrounding the original donated parcel.  In 1969, the North Carolina General Assembly appropriated $15,000 to purchase the property, to be matched by funds raised locally by the Iredell County Historical Society; these purchases were made in 1971 and 1973.  By 1976, the land was opened as a historic site.

By 2006, archaeologists and historical researchers had determined the exact location of Fort Dobbs, and had located the post-hole foundations of the former log structure. Excavation began in 1967, and by 1968, the site of the fort was confirmed. In 1967, Stanley South, an archaeologist and proponent of processual archaeology, discovered that by overlaying a transparency depicting a survey of the Fort Dobbs site done in the mid-18th-century on a modern aerial photograph, evidence of the surveyed lines could still be discerned in the modern terrain.  Additionally, excavations revealed a moat that surrounded the blockhouse, as well as trash in the moat contemporary with the fort.  Early archaeological work concentrated specifically on the moat and a depression called the "cellar", which South believed served as a storage space in the middle of the fort grounds, and which later researchers believe was directly underneath the blockhouse.  Archaeological work has unearthed evidence of a palisade surrounding the blockhouse, in a similar fashion to other French and Indian War-era forts such as Fort Shirley near Heath, Massachusetts, and Fort Prince George.

In 2006, a researcher affiliated with East Carolina University, Lawrence Babits, presented a study and a reconstruction plan that has been accepted by the Friends of Fort Dobbs, the 501(c)(3) nonprofit organization that supports the site, and the North Carolina Department of Cultural Resources.  In his plan, Babits postulated that Dobbs most likely played a role in designing the fort, basing the design on forts with which Dobbs had first-hand experience as an administrator in Scotland, such as Bernera Barracks near Glenelg and Ruthven Barracks near Kingussie.  From these comparisons, the contemporary description of the fort, and the soil record, Babits concluded that the "opposite angles" described by Francis Brown in 1756 actually referred to "flankers", or square wooden structures attached to the corner of the fort that would have allowed defending soldiers to shoot into the flank of any attacking forces surrounding the building.

Historic site
The State of North Carolina Department of Natural and Cultural History maintains and operates the area as Fort Dobbs State Historic Site. The visitor center, located in a log cabin constructed from parts of local, 19th-century log structures, features displays about both the colonial fort and the French and Indian War period.  Outdoor trails lead visitors through the excavated ruins of the fort.  Events, including many living history demonstrations, are held throughout the year at the fort. The Fort Dobbs site remains the only historic site in the state related to the French and Indian War.

Yearly attendance at the site is about 27,000 people. , a campaign to renovate the site and restore much of Fort Dobbs is underway with the goal of raising $2.6 million for the project. A grant of $150,000 was given by the Institute of Museum and Library Services for the design of the project.  In 2010, the Friends of Fort Dobbs pledged $500,000 to the North Carolina Historic Sites program for the reconstruction of the fort.  On January 5, 2013, Governor Bev Perdue signed a lease on behalf of the State to the Friends organization, allowing the nonprofit group to hire a private contractor for the fort's reconstruction.
As of 2017, the first phase of reconstruction has taken place. The original foundation and chimney has been rebuilt, and full restoration of Fort Dobbs is underway. The fully rebuilt Fort Dobbs officially opened September 21, 2019.

See also
 Colonial American military history
 Fort Johnston (North Carolina) – contemporary colonial North Carolina fort
 French and Indian Wars
 Rowan County Regiment

References

Footnotes

Bibliography

External links

 Friends of Fort Dobbs, Inc.
 North Carolina State Historic Sites page
 North Carolina History Project, "Fort Dobbs"

1756 establishments in the British Empire
Arthur Dobbs
Demolished buildings and structures in North Carolina
Dobbs
Dobbs
Dobbs
Dobbs
Military installations established in 1756
Military installations closed in 1764
Military and war museums in North Carolina
Museums established in 1967
Museums in Iredell County, North Carolina
National Register of Historic Places in Iredell County, North Carolina
North Carolina State Historic Sites
Protected areas of Iredell County, North Carolina
Rebuilt buildings and structures in North Carolina